Philipp Wilhelm of Limburg Stirum (1695–1758), count of Limburg Stirum, was the second son of Moritz Hermann of Limburg.

He married NN, countess von Hoensbroech	and they had five children:

 Ferdinand count of Limburg Stirum, born in 1724;
 Alexander count of Limburg Stirum, born in 1730, probably died young;
 Alexander count of Limburg Stirum, born 1737 and died in 1740;
 Johann Philipp count of Limburg Stirum, born in 1740 and died in Paris c. 1790; and
 Anna Aloysia Elisabeth countess of Limburg Stirum, born in 1725, married Baron Franz Bernhard von Leopfechting, and died in 1771.

1695 births
1758 deaths
Philipp Wilhelm